
Year 171 BC was a year of the pre-Julian Roman calendar. At the time it was known as the Year of the Consulship of Crassus and Longinus (or, less frequently, year 583 Ab urbe condita). The denomination 171 BC for this year has been used since the early medieval period, when the Anno Domini calendar era became the prevalent method in Europe for naming years.

Events 
 By place 

 Greece 
 Epirus joins Macedonia in the latter's fight against Rome. However, the leagues of southern Greece remain neutral.
 Thanks to the efforts of Eumenes II of Pergamum while in Rome, the Romans declare war on Macedonia and send troops to Thessaly, thus beginning the Third Macedonian War. In the resulting Battle of Callicinus the Macedonians, led by their king, Perseus, are victorious over a Roman force led by consul Publius Licinius Crassus.
 Boiotian League dissolved by the Romans.

 Roman Republic 
 The first Roman colony outside Italy is founded at Carteia in southern Hispania after Iberian-born descendants of Roman soldiers appear before the Roman Senate to request a town to live in and are given Carteia, which is named Colonia Libertinorum Carteia.
 Lucius Postumius Albinus is sent by Rome as an ambassador to King Masinissa of Numidia, and to the Carthaginians in order to raise troops for the war against Perseus of Macedonia.

 Parthia 
 Mithradates I succeeds his brother Phraates I as king of Parthia.

Deaths 
 Phraates I, King of Parthia, who has ruled the country since 176 BC

References